Education in Anguilla is compulsory between the ages of 5 and 17.  In 1998, the gross primary enrollment rate was 100.7 percent, and the net primary enrollment rate was 98.9 percent.  The government has collaborated with UNESCO to develop an Education for All plan that aims to raise educational achievement levels, improve access to quality special education services and provide human resource training for teachers and education managers.

Library
There is a single library, the Edison L. Hughes Education & Library Complex of the Anguilla Public Library.

Schools
Area churches operate the preschools. There are six government primary schools, one government secondary school, and two private schools.

Government primary schools:
Alwyn Allison Primary School, West End
Adrian T. Hazell Primary School, South Hill
Orealia Kelly Primary School, Stoney Ground
Valley Primary School, The Valley
Morris Vanterpool Primary School, East End
Vivian Vanterpool Primary School, Island Harbour
 the government primary schools had about 1,460 students in total.

The government secondary school is Albena Lake Hodge Comprehensive School in The Valley.

Private schools:
Central Christian School, The Valley
It uses the Abeka curriculum and has preschool and primary school levels.
Omololu International School, The Valley
It was Anguilla's first private school, and opened in 1994 as the Teacher Gloria Omololu Institute. It adopted its current name on 1 April 2013. It uses the International Baccalaureate (IB) curriculum. The name "Omululu" means "Child of God" in the Yoruba language.

Colleges and universities
The Open Campus of the University of the West Indies has a site in Anguilla. It also has campuses in Barbados, Trinidad, and Jamaica. The government of Anguilla contributes financially to the UWI.

A branch of the Saint James School of Medicine was established in 2011 in Anguilla. It is a private, for-profit medical school headquartered in Park Ridge, Illinois.

See also
List of schools in Anguilla
Saint James School of Medicine

References

 
Society of Anguilla